Peter Fieber Jr. (born 10 December 1989) is a Slovak football player who currently plays for the Slovak 3. liga club Dunajská Lužná. He has been with Lužná since 2012.

Club career
Prior to signing professionally with Bratislava for the 2008—2009 season, he played on their youth teams. He moved to Petržalka after the season ended. While there, he played in the Corgoň League, Slovakia's first division. After Petržalka, he transferred to Honvéd in Budapest on a 2.5 year contract, but left in 2011. In July 2011, he joined Slovak club FK LAFC Lučenec, where he continues to play.

Personal life
His father Peter Fieber is a coach and retired football.

References

1989 births
Living people
Footballers from Bratislava
Slovak footballers
Association football midfielders
FK Inter Bratislava players
FC Petržalka players
Slovak Super Liga players
MŠK Novohrad Lučenec players
FC DAC 1904 Dunajská Streda players
Slovak expatriate footballers
Expatriate footballers in Hungary
Budapest Honvéd FC players
Slovak expatriate sportspeople in Hungary